Luis Miguel Marquinez Preciado (born 10 April 2003) is a Colombian footballer who currently plays as a goalkeeper for Atlético Nacional.

Club career
Born in Tumaco, Nariño Department, Marquinez started his career with amateur side Club Deportivo Sol de Oriente JCO. On 11 July 2022, despite being the third-choice goalkeeper at Atlético Nacional at the time, he made his professional debut in a 1–1 Categoría Primera A game against Cortuluá. With Aldair Quintana reportedly to be leaving the club ahead of the 2023 season, Marquinez was tipped to be made second-choice goalkeeper.

International career
Marquinez has represented Colombia at under-19 and under-20 level. He was called up to the under-20 side for the 2023 South American U-20 Championship.

Career statistics

Club

Notes

References

2003 births
Living people
People from Tumaco
Sportspeople from Nariño Department
Colombian footballers
Colombia youth international footballers
Association football goalkeepers
Categoría Primera A players
Atlético Nacional footballers